Kampaniakos F.C. is a Greek football club, based in Chalastra, Thessaloniki.

The club was founded in 1947. They played for 5 seasons in a row in Gamma Ethniki until season 2017-18.

External links
 http://www.kampaniakos.gr

Football clubs in Central Macedonia